Luis María Echeberría Igartua (24 March 1940 – 19 October 2016) was a Spanish footballer who played as a defender.

Club career
Born in Asua, Biscay, Echeberría signed for Athletic Bilbao in 1961 at the age of 21 from Basque Country neighbours CD Basconia, at that time still not the club's farm team. He made his first-team – and La Liga – debut on 10 September 1961 in a 1–2 away loss against Sevilla FC, and finished his debut season with 29 league appearances (out of a possible 30) as his team finished fifth.

In the following years, Echeberría would be part of a legendary Athletic defense that also featured José Ángel Iribar in goal, Jesús Aranguren and Iñaki Sáez, helping the Lions to the 1969 Copa del Rey and appearing in more than 300 official games with his main club. He retired from football in 1973 (aged 33) after one season with Barakaldo CF, in Segunda División.

International career
Echeberría earned four caps for Spain, during nearly one year (exactly 11 months and three weeks). His debut came on 6 June 1962 as the national team lost 1–2 against Brazil at Viña del Mar in that year's FIFA World Cup, for an eventual group stage exit.

Honours
Athletic Bilbao
Copa del Generalísimo: 1969; Runner-up 1965–66, 1966–67

References

External links
 
 
 
 
 

1940 births
2016 deaths
People from Erandio
Spanish footballers
Footballers from the Basque Country (autonomous community)
Association football defenders
La Liga players
Segunda División players
Tercera División players
CD Getxo players
CD Basconia footballers
Athletic Bilbao footballers
Barakaldo CF footballers
Spain B international footballers
Spain international footballers
1962 FIFA World Cup players
Basque Country international footballers
Sportspeople from Biscay